Irene van Dyk  (née Viljoen; born 21 June 1972) is a South African-born New Zealand netball player. A goal-shooter, van Dyk is one of the world's best-known netballers and is the most capped international player of all time: in every game she consistently attained over 90%. She is recognised as the greatest goal-shooter of all time. Van Dyk has had a huge impact on Netball, and almost single-handedly changing the way it is played, both in New Zealand and around the world, while contributing immensely to its growing popularity.

Debuting in 1994, she represented South Africa 72 times and captained the team. In 2000, she moved to Wellington, New Zealand and was quickly picked for the national team, the Silver Ferns. This caused some minor controversy, as the only rule in netball at the time for players switching between nations was a ban on playing for more than one nation in a calendar year.

She was the 2003 New Zealand Sportswoman of the Year and a nominee in 2005.
She became a New Zealand citizen in 2005, and represented New Zealand for 14 years before retiring from international netball in June 2014.

Van Dyk played for the Central Pulse in the ANZ Championship from 2014, taking a coaching role in more recent years. For most of her domestic career in New Zealand she played for the Waikato/Bay of Plenty Magic (2003–2013).

Personal life
Irene van Dyk was born Irene Viljoen in Vereeniging, Gauteng, South Africa. Her mother, also called Irene, died in July 2012 following a long battle with cancer. Her father Herman Viljoen died during a routine appendix operation in 1992.

In 1994 she married Christie van Dyk and the two have one child, a daughter named Bianca. Bianca followed her mother into netball.

Irene van Dyk is a teacher, having worked in both primary and intermediate schools.

A Christian, van Dyk supported the "Lifeathon" fund-raising event for Christian music radio network Life FM.
A 2002 biography about her by Russell Gray is called Changing Colours.

Netball technique
She shoots 300 goals a day for fun. Her husband Christie analyses her play.

She is renowned for her consistent shooting volume and accuracy, with shooting percentages that are rarely seen in netball. Her 191 cm height, natural athleticism and strong hands help her dominate opponents.

South African career
She made her debut for the South African national side in 1994 and went on to captain the side and represent them 72 times. She was part of the silver medal-winning South African team who beat New Zealand 59–57 in the first round of the 1995 Netball World Championships and lost 68–48 to Australia in the final.

NZ career

Van Dyk emigrated to New Zealand in 2000. Since moving to NZ Van Dyk's game grew, with improvements in her ball handling/security, movement, spatial awareness and strength.

2002 Commonwealth Games
Van Dyk won a silver medal as part of the New Zealand team that lost the final 57–55 against Australia at the 2002 Commonwealth Games in Manchester, England after double overtime.

2003 Netball World Championships
The Silver Ferns won the Netball World Championships in Kingston, Jamaica beating Australia 49–47 in the final. Van Dyk netted 41 goals from 43 attempts at 95%. The Silver Ferns had not won a major event since the 1987 World Netball Championships in Glasgow, Scotland.

2004
On 5 July 2004 she came on at the start of the 3rd quarter of the third test match in a series against Australia and scored 24 from 24 shots to turn the match around.

In November 2004 she went to Australia where the Silver Ferns were defeated 2-1 by Australia. Features of the series were the loss of Australian Captain and goal keeper Liz Ellis from part of the 1st Test and all of the 2nd Test after being injured during a clash with van Dyk, and the noticeable increase of calls going against van Dyk penalising her for stepping and contacting other players.

2005
In the winter of 2005 a one-off Test was played in Sydney where the Silver Ferns beat Australia 50–43.  Van Dyk was a dominant factor in the win and cemented her position as the world's greatest goal shooter especially against Australia's own formidable shooting weapon Catherine Cox whose own form fell away after being worn down by New Zealand's goal keeper Vilimaina Davu.

From 2003 to 2013 van Dyk played national league netball for the Waikato Magic and in 2005 spearheaded their first National Bank Cup title. The win finished the Southern Sting's six-year winning streak.

In October 2005 van Dyk helped defeat Australia 61–36. In a match notable for the loss of Australian Captain Liz Ellis for three-quarters of the match, New Zealand were too good for Australia with their speed, ball handling, uncompromising defence and shooting accuracy. Partnered with goal attack Jodi Te Huna, van Dyk's composure and athleticism came to the fore and Australia appeared to have no response to this and the overall effort of New Zealand.

New Zealand had an undefeated year in 2005 including a successful end of year tour to the Caribbean where they beat Barbados and Jamaica.

2006 Commonwealth Games
New Zealand faced Australia, the defending champions, in the final of 2006 Commonwealth Games in Melbourne. Van Dyk performed with skill and determination in an enthralling battle against Australian goal keeper and home town girl Bianca Chatfield who gave a sterling performance against her. (Liz Ellis wasn't available due to injury.) New Zealand won the final 60–55. Van Dyk shot a tournament high 300 goals from 324 shots for 93 percent during the games.

2009
On September the 23rd 2009, van Dyk played her 100th test for New Zealand, a 52–36 win over Australia. New Zealand lost the series 3–2.

2010 Commonwealth Games
In 2010, van Dyk was chosen to lead the New Zealand team in the Opening Ceremony of the 2010 Commonwealth Games in Delhi.
The 2010 Games also saw her become the most capped player in Silver Ferns history, surpassing Lesley Rumball's 110 caps.

Van Dyk shot 32 from 32 in the semi-final and 25 from 29 (86%) in the final when New Zealand beat Australia 66–64.

2012
In June van Dyk celebrated her 40th birthday and said she had no plans to retire.
In the ANZ Championship she shot a tournament high 501 goals from 527 shots at 95.1%. In the 2012 ANZ Championship season, she also led her team to the Grand Final, where the Magic beat the Vixens 41–38, to become the first ever New Zealand Franchise to win the ANZ Championship. Van Dyk netted 25/26 in that game.

2014 - International retirement
Van Dyk transferred to the Central Pulse following the resignation of coach Noeline Taurua from her previous team, Waikato/Bay of Plenty Magic. She averaged 27 goals per game, lower than previous seasons.

On 5 June 2014,Irene Van Dyk announced her retirement from international netball, saying "I have really high expectations of myself and my match statistics over the past few months in the ANZ Championship are simply not good enough to justify taking my game to the international level".

Her 20-year international career helped make her the most capped player of all time, with 217 caps (72 for South Africa and 145 for New Zealand). Her international career finished with 5917 goals from 6572 shots, a 90% shooting record. For the Silver Ferns she shot 4796 goals from 5288 attempts at 91%.

See also
 New Zealand national netball team

References

External links
 Netball New Zealand profile: Irene van Dyk
  Netball Shooting Stats ANZ Championship 2009 to 2012

New Zealand international netball players
South African netball players
Waikato Bay of Plenty Magic players
Central Pulse players
ANZ Championship players
Commonwealth Games competitors for South Africa
Commonwealth Games gold medallists for New Zealand
Commonwealth Games silver medallists for New Zealand
Netball players at the 1998 Commonwealth Games
Netball players at the 2002 Commonwealth Games
Netball players at the 2006 Commonwealth Games
Netball players at the 2010 Commonwealth Games
Members of the New Zealand Order of Merit
People from Vereeniging
People with acquired New Zealand citizenship
Afrikaner people
South African people of Dutch descent
South African emigrants to New Zealand
1972 births
Living people
Commonwealth Games medallists in netball
Capital Shakers players
Sportspeople from Gauteng
1995 World Netball Championships players
2003 World Netball Championships players
2011 World Netball Championships players
2007 World Netball Championships players
South African expatriate netball people in New Zealand
Central Pulse coaches
New Zealand international Fast5 players
National Bank Cup players
Medallists at the 2002 Commonwealth Games
Medallists at the 2006 Commonwealth Games
Medallists at the 2010 Commonwealth Games